National Tertiary Route 723, or just Route 723 (or ) is a National Road Route of Costa Rica, located in the Alajuela province.

Description
In Alajuela province the route covers Poás canton (San Pedro, Carrillos districts).

References

Highways in Costa Rica